Sydney Mailmay refer to:

 Sydney Mail (train service), a train service that existed between 1888 and 1972 going from Brisbane to Wallangarra, where passengers would transfer at Wallangarra for the Brisbane Limited.
 The Sydney Mail, an Australian magazine that was published weekly in Sydney between 1860 and 1938.